Aloe aageodonta is a species of aloe plant found in Kitui County, Kenya

External links
 Aloe aageodonta at Plants of the World Online

aageodonta
Plants described in 1993